Ronald Brent Alexander (born July 10, 1971) is a former American football free safety in the National Football League. He played professionally for the Arizona Cardinals, the Carolina Panthers, Pittsburgh Steelers, and New York Giants. He is now the head coach at Station Camp High School in his hometown of Gallatin.

Biography
Alexander was born in Gallatin, Tennessee and graduated from Gallatin High School in Gallatin. He played college football at Tennessee State University. He was signed as an undrafted free agent by the Arizona Cardinals in 1994. He played in the NFL for twelve years.

After retiring from the NFL, Alexander became a high school math teacher.

References

External links
Brent Alexander at NFL.com
Retirement
SI.com

1971 births
Living people
People from Gallatin, Tennessee
Players of American football from Tennessee
American football safeties
American football cornerbacks
Tennessee State Tigers football players
Arizona Cardinals players
Carolina Panthers players
Pittsburgh Steelers players
New York Giants players